Tannenberg is a 1932 Swiss–German war film directed by Heinz Paul and starring Hans Stüwe, Käthe Haack and Jutta Sauer. The film is based on the 1914 Battle of Tannenberg during the First World War. It focuses on a German landowner Captan von Arndt and his family.

Production
It was shot on location in East Prussia and at UFA's Babelsberg Studios during the summer of 1932. It cost over half a million reichsmarks to make and employed 8,000 people. The film focused on a notable German victory and was in sharp contrast to recent anti-war films such as Westfront 1918. Tannenberg served as a national symbol in Germany, and was re-issued in 1936 during the Nazi era. The Producers made an effort to make the film as historically accurate as possible, and portrayed the Russian commanders respectfully. It was due to be released on 26 August 1932, the eighteenth anniversary of the battle, but was delayed by the censors acting on a request from the German President Paul von Hindenburg who was unhappy with his portrayal in the film and the premiere was pushed back until certain scenes had been cut.

Cast
 Hans Stüwe as Gutsbesitzer Rittmeister von Arndt
 Käthe Haack as Grete von Arndt
 Jutta Sauer as Inge von Arndt
 Hertha von Walther as Schwägerin Sonja
 Erika Dannhoff as Schwägerin Lita
 Hannelore Benzinger as Lisbeth, Arndt, Magd
 Karl Klöckner as Gutsverwalter Puchheiten
 Franziska Kinz as Gutsfrau Frau Puchheiten
 Rudolf Klicks as Fritz Puchheiten
 Alfred Döderlein as Leutnant Schmidz
 Wolfgang Staudte as Husar Franke
 Karl Körner as Paul von Hindenburg
 Henry Pleß as Generalmajor Ludendorff
 Hans Mühlhofer as Oberstleutnant Hoffmann
 Friedrich Franz Stampe as Generalmajor Grünert
 Alfred Gerasch as Generalmajor Graf von Waldensee
 Graf Schönborn as Hauptmann Fleischmann von Theißruck
 Edgar Boltz as General von Scholz
 Georg H. Schnell as General der Kavallerie Shilinski
 Sigurd Lohde as General der Kavallerie Samsonow
 Carl Auen as Generalmajor Postowski
 Georg Schmieter as Oberst Gerwe
 Aruth Wartan as  Stabstrompeter Kupschik
 Fritz Arno Wagner as Militärattaché Oberst Knox
 Ernst Pröckl as General der Artillerie Martos
 Erwin Suttner as General der Infanterie Kljujew
 Fritz Alberti as Generalleutnant Mingin
 Valy Arnheim as Oberstleutnant Fjedorow
 Viktor de Kowa as Rittmeister Fürst Wolgoff
 Friedrich Ettel as Kosakenwachtmeister

References

Bibliography
 Kester, Bernadette. Film Front Weimar: Representations of the First World War in German films of the Weimar Period (1919-1933). Amsterdam University Press, 2003.
 Von der Goltz, Anna. Hindenburg: Power, Myth, and the Rise of the Nazis. Oxford University Press, 2009.

External links

1932 films
1930s war films
German war films
Swiss war films
1930s German-language films
Films directed by Heinz Paul
World War I films based on actual events
World War I films set on the Eastern Front
Films of the Weimar Republic
Cultural depictions of Erich Ludendorff
Cultural depictions of Paul von Hindenburg
German black-and-white films
Films shot at Babelsberg Studios
1930s German films